Annona nitida is a species of tree in the Annonaceae family. It is native to Peru, Brazil and Venezuela.

References

nitida
Trees of Peru
Trees of Brazil
Trees of Venezuela